Gadibidi Krishna is a 1998 Indian Kannada-language action drama film, written and directed by Om Sai Prakash and produced by Bharati Devi. It stars Shiva Rajkumar, Ravali and Indraja. The musical score is by Hamsalekha. The film is a remake of the Telugu film, Sommokadidi Sokokadidi.

Plot

The film depicts identical twins, a city-bred doctor and a villager, who swap identities for personal gain. Chaos ensues.

Krishna, a village simpleton, visits the city. One day, he comes across his lookalike: Dr. Shivram. Krishna starts plotting to take Dr. Shivram's place. But he soon realizes that Dr. Shivram has his own problems.

Shivram discovers that he has a lookalike and visits Krishna's home. When he arrives, he learns that he and Krishna were identical twins separated at birth. Thugs kidnap Shivram for money, but Krishna and his family manage to defeat them. By the end of the film, the brothers are reunited.

Cast
 Shiva Rajkumar as Krishna / Dr Shivram (Double Role)
 Ravali 
 Indraja
 C. R. Simha 
 Tara
 B. V. Radha
 Avinash
 Sihi Kahi Chandru
 Ramesh Bhat
 Vani shree
 Kunigal Nagabhushan
 Mysore Ramanand 
 Mandeep Rai 
 Mandya Ramesh
 M. S. Karanth 
 Vaasu Dev 
 Anil Kumar 
 Bharath Kumar 
 Pushpa Swamy
 Mandya Ramesh 
 Charulatha as Special Appearance in the Song

Soundtrack
All the songs were composed and written by Hamsalekha.

References

1998 films
1990s Kannada-language films
1998 action drama films
Films scored by Hamsalekha
Indian action drama films
Kannada remakes of Telugu films
Films directed by Sai Prakash
1998 drama films